Robert Burton Gooden (September 18, 1874 – August 24, 1976) was a suffragan bishop in the Episcopal Diocese of Los Angeles. He helped found the Gooden Center, a residential facility in Pasadena for recovery from alcohol and drug addiction. He was the oldest bishop in The Episcopal Church when he died at the age of 101. His son, Reginald Heber Gooden, was also a bishop.

References

1874 births
1976 deaths
American centenarians
Men centenarians
Episcopal bishops of Los Angeles